Ashley Walters (born 30 June 1982), also known by his stage name Asher D, is a British rapper, songwriter and actor. He played Ricky in Bullet Boy (2004), the lead role as Dushane Hill in Top Boy, and Antwan in Get Rich or Die Tryin' (2005). He has also appeared in British TV shows such as Grange Hill, The Bill, Holby City, Doctor Who, Silent Witness and the 2015 BBC police programme Cuffs.

Early life
Walters was born in Peckham, south-east London, to Jamaican parents. He was raised by his mother, Pamela Case, a local government officer. He attended St. Georges CE Primary School, Camberwell, from the age of four. He then went on to Pimlico School, now known as Pimlico Academy.

Having undertaken classes at the Sylvia Young Theatre School, after leaving school Walters starred in some stage productions.

In July 2001, following an argument with a traffic warden, Walters was found to be carrying a loaded Brocock air pistol modified to fire live ammunition. He was arrested and, in 2002, jailed for 18 months, in a young offenders' institute. Having spent the previous nine months in custody, he subsequently served an additional nine months to complete his sentence.

Music career
Walters joined the group So Solid Crew.

After the group split, in 2006 he recorded In Memory of the Street Fighter, featuring the single "Andrea". He released a studio album in 2008 entitled The Appetiser, a 12-track album produced with Laurence Ezra. In early 2012, Walters signed a recording contract with the independent record label SK Records. His single "How You Like Me Now" was released on 29 July 2012, followed up by "Your Love" released on 12 November 2012, featuring vocals from Alesha Dixon.

Acting career
Walters is also an actor, appearing under his full name, Ashley Walters. He appeared on television as Omar in The Young Indiana Jones Chronicles and as Andy in Grange Hill, both at the age of 14. He appeared in Saul Dibb's 2004 feature film Bullet Boy, where he played Ricky, who had just been released from prison and back into living a normal life, a role for which Walters was named Best Newcomer at the British Independent Film Awards. He also appeared in 2005's Get Rich or Die Tryin'.

In 2006, he played the role of Wolf in the film Stormbreaker, and Danny in Life and Lyrics, for which he has received many plaudits. In 2007, he starred in WΔZ, alongside Selma Blair and Melissa George, and in Sugarhouse. He played Lacey in the BBC Three drama pilot West 10 LDN. He played the character Billy Bond in five episodes of the fourth series of BBC TV drama Hustle. He also appeared in the MTV series Top Buzzer and played the role of Al B in the 2006 production House of 9, alongside Dennis Hopper.

Walters performed on stage in 2002 at the Royal National Theatre in Roy Williams' Sing Yer Heart Out for the Lads and in 2008 at the Royal Court Theatre in Levi David Addai's Oxford Street. Another feature film, Tuesday (2008), sees him playing a jewel thief. He appeared in Bola Agbaje's play Off the Endz at the Royal Court Theatre during February and March 2010.

He made appearances in ITV's police drama The Bill and firefighting drama London's Burning. His Grange Hill history and autobiography was referenced by the comedian Stewart Lee on 16 March 2009, on the BBC Two show Stewart Lee's Comedy Vehicle in the episode themed on "Toilet Books". Walters also appeared on BBC TV in 2009's adaptation of Andrea Levy's Small Island and as Jack Holt in the short-lived drama  Outcasts in February and March 2011.

For the BBC Learning project "Off By Heart Shakespeare", Walters delivered one of Shakespeare's best known speeches — "But soft, what light through yonder window breaks?" from Romeo and Juliet. In October 2011, Walters starred in the Arjun Rose slasher Demons Never Die. From 31 October 2011, he played Dushane in Channel 4's four-part drama Top Boy. In February 2012, he played Chris in the BBC drama Inside Men. In 2013, Walters reprised his role as main character Dushane in the second series of Top Boy.

He managed to get in trouble with the producers on the first day of filming Doctor Who episode "Journey to the Centre of the TARDIS" when he tweeted a picture of himself in his costume in his trailer with the word "space". The picture was immediately removed.

In 2017, Walters received the British Urban Film Festival honorary award from Lisa Maffia & Sheila Nortley at the BT Tower in London for 25 years outstanding contribution to film and television. Walters reprised his role in 2019 as Dushane in Top Boy again following its revival on streaming service Netflix, appearing in the third series that year and the fourth series of the drama in 2022.

Personal life
Walters has three children with his ex-partner. He married in 2013 and had a daughter in 2014. In 2016 they had a son. He also has two young daughters.

On 31 March 2014, he was fined £600 after he admitted assaulting a security guard in Aberdeen in September 2013. In July 2014, he was fined £1250 for possession of cannabis at Holyhead, Anglesey. In May 2016, Walters was fined £1000 after admitting using threatening words and behaviour towards staff at the Hilton Hotel, Islington.  Walters has said his father's absence while he was growing up contributed to his criminal behaviour.

Walters is an avid supporter of Arsenal F.C.

Political views
In December 2019, along with 42 other leading cultural figures, Walters signed a letter endorsing the Labour Party under Jeremy Corbyn's leadership in the 2019 general election. The letter stated that "Labour's election manifesto under Jeremy Corbyn's leadership offers a transformative plan that prioritises the needs of people and the planet over private profit and the vested interests of a few."

Filmography

Film

Television

Web

Discography

Studio albums

Mixtapes

Singles

References

External links
 
 
 Asher D at Myspace

1982 births
Living people
Rappers from London
Black British male rappers
Grime music artists
Male actors from London
So Solid Crew members
UK garage musicians
BBC people
People from Peckham
Alumni of the Sylvia Young Theatre School
English people of Jamaican descent